Porophryne erythrodactylus, also known as the Red-fingered anglerfish or the Bare Island anglerfish  is a species of frogfish endemic to Australia. This species occurs Kurnell and Bare Island in Botany Bay, New South Wales, Australia. This species is the only known member of its genus. This genus is a sister genus of Kuiterichthys.

The fish achieves camouflage by looking like the algae-covered sponges found in its rocky, subtidal habitat.

References

Antennariidae
Fish described in 2014
Taxa named by Theodore Wells Pietsch III